is a Japanese singer-songwriter. Her musical career began in the underground music culture of Tokyo's Kōenji neighborhood, briefly playing in the punk band Kuchuu Moranko before going solo and releasing two independent albums until signing with major record label Avex Trax in 2014. Oomori's music style is influenced by idol culture and punk rock among other clashing musical styles, and she is considered one of the early pioneers of the "anti-idol" and alternative idol scenes led by groups like BiS that would eventually give way to the more popular Kawaii metal movement, utilizing shock value and performance art throughout the early parts of her career.

Career 
Born in Matsuyama, Ehime Prefecture, Oomori moved to Tokyo to attend Musashino Art University in Kodaira. Starting from 2007, Oomori performed in one of Kōenji's "live houses" named Muryoku Muzenji, singing while playing an acoustic guitar. In 2011, Oomori formed a band named . During her time in Kōenji, Oomori's music pushed back against the dominance of Japanese idols on the music charts, a style that Ian Martin of The Japan Times compares to Jun Togawa and Ringo Sheena. Oomori held multiple concerts within Tokyo, including a first appearance at the 2013 Tokyo Idol Festival, a venue she would continue to appear in. Her growing popularity attracted the attention of Avex Trax to offer a contract in 2014.

Oomori's first album with Avex Trax, Sennō, sees her depart from her guitar-wielding "anti-idol" image to explore other types of music by incorporating more electronic elements, but her lyrics still explore darker themes, similar to Avex Trax's other band BiS. Her subsequent albums saw her continue to adapt to a more mainstream-friendly style and adapting from even more genres. In 2018, Oomori created an idol group named ZOC (short for "zone of control") in which she was both a member and a producer.  On 9 June 2021, ZOC released their first album PvP, a double-album produced by Oomori herself with additional contributions from Kenta Sakurai, the producer of now-defunct idol group Maison Book Girl. Later that year on 9 November, ex-BiS and Maison Book Girl member Megumi Koshouji debuted her new idol group MAPA with the full-length album Shitennou, produced entirely by Oomori.

Personal life 
Oomori announced in 2014 that she had gotten married, although she did not specify to whom. In 2020 she publicly revealed her husband's identity as Pierre Nakano of Ling tosite Sigure, also the long-time drummer in her backing band. The couple have one son, who was born in 2015.

Discography

Studio albums

Extended plays

Compilation albums

Singles

References

External links 
 Official Website

1987 births
Living people
21st-century Japanese singers
21st-century Japanese women singers
Japanese women singer-songwriters
Japanese singer-songwriters
Musicians from Ehime Prefecture
People from Matsuyama, Ehime